
Gmina Gielniów is a rural gmina (administrative district) in Przysucha County, Masovian Voivodeship, in east-central Poland.

Villages
Gmina Gielniów contains the villages and settlements of Antoniów, Bieliny, Brzezinki, Drynia Stużańska, Gałki, Gielniów, Goździków, Huta, Jastrząb, Kotfin, Marysin, Mechlin, Rozwady, Snarki, Sołtysy, Stoczki, Wywóz, Zielonka and Zygmuntów.

Neighbouring gminas
Gmina Gielniów is bordered by the gminas of Drzewica, Gowarczów, Opoczno, Przysucha and Rusinów.

References
Polish official population figures 2006

Gielniow
Przysucha County